Pallewela Grama Niladhari Division is a Grama Niladhari Division of the Uva Paranagama Divisional Secretariat  of Badulla District  of Uva Province, Sri Lanka .  It has Grama Niladhari Division Code 45D.

Pallewela is a surrounded by the Busdulla, Unapana, Balagala, Kumarapattiya, Sapugolla and Lunuwatta  Grama Niladhari Divisions.

Demographics

Ethnicity 

The Pallewela Grama Niladhari Division has a Sinhalese majority (97.9%) . In comparison, the Uva Paranagama Divisional Secretariat (which contains the Pallewela Grama Niladhari Division) has a Sinhalese majority (83.8%) and a significant Indian Tamil population (11.2%)

Religion 

The Pallewela Grama Niladhari Division has a Buddhist majority (98.5%) . In comparison, the Uva Paranagama Divisional Secretariat (which contains the Pallewela Grama Niladhari Division) has a Buddhist majority (83.8%) and a significant Hindu population (12.3%)

Grama Niladhari Divisions of Uva Paranagama Divisional Secretariat

References